The Ashanti–Fante War (1806–1807) was a war fought between the Ashanti Empire and the Fante Confederacy in the region of what is currently the Republic of Ghana.

The Ashanti Empire became the most powerful of the interior after finally defeating the Denkyira under whom they were a vassal state.  The Ashanti Empire ruled from 1701 to 1957 by the Oyoko Clan. The main source of wealth in the Akan economy was gold, but during the conflicts between Fante and Ashanti many war captives were sold as prisoners and then into slavery by both sides. This group was created by a small group which used to call themselves Oyoko, which primarily were the descendants of the founder of the Bona kingdom in the Ivory Coast. A group of the Fante were said to have migrated to the south of Etsi by the beginning of the seventeenth century. The Fante are related by to the Ashantis as both groups originated from the Bono Kingdom. Fantes were complex connection and cluster of several independent states that were the dominant power based mostly chiefly on the coastal regions of the Gold Coast. Group interaction between the Ashanti and Fante had long existed, since historically, the Fante were thought of as a breakaway group of the initial Akan clan. However, by the beginning of the nineteenth century, this group action had escalated to hostility because they Fante had grown wealthy by controlling trade between Europeans and the interior. Over time, the British were the standard European allies of the Fante, whereas the Dutch sided with the Ashanti.

Due to this alliance with the British, several historic Fante Asafo Companies (War Units) had the Union Jack as part of their Frankaa (Regimental battle flags). These flags became prized collection items for many Europeans in the Coast Coast.

The war began in 1806 when the Ashanti king, or Asantehene, brought charges of grave robbing on some of his subjects who run from Kumasi to Assin. Fleeing Ashanti lands, these suspected grave robbers were granted refuge by the Fante. Ashanti king Osei Bonsu sent out an army against the Fante for harboring fugitives. At Abura Dunkwa, a major battle was fought, during which the Ashanti were initially victorious and captured the accused Assin Chief, Otsibu. After they captured Otsibu, the Ashanti commander, Appia Dunkwa, sent his men further inward to Fante territory where they met the rear guard and support army of the Fante Forces commanded by Atta that had previously broken away from the other Fante armies at Mumford. The combined Fante Union Army now under Atta's command rendezvoused at Tantumkweri where they defeated the Ashanti after a long day of fighting.

Aftermath of War

Ashanti–Fante War breaks out

This war, also known as the Ghana War, begins between the Ashanti associate degree Fante Confederacies of present–day Ghana. The Ashanti had resisted makes an attempt by Europeans, chiefly the British, to colonize them, and aligned themselves with the Dutch to limit British influence within the region. However, the British still annexed neighboring areas, together with the Fante, and also the succeeding conflicts eventually increase into the war of 1806, during which the Ashanti are victorious. In 1811 the Ga–Fante War sees the defeat of the Ashanti, though they still capture a British fort. In 1814 the Ashanti launch an invasion of the Gold Coast, totally routing the tribes allied with the Europeans.

First Anglo-Ashanti War begins
in West Africa 
War begins between the United Kingdom and the Ashanti. With the occurrence of the Ashanti–Fante War in 1806, the groups that  had been allied with the Fante people against the Ashanti like the Ga people,  leading a series of wars, and the Ashanti, allied with the Dutch, tried to limit European, particularly British, power within the region of the Gold Coast. A series of forts were designed by the British Government in the region from 1821 that the Ashanti plan to invade and capture. In 1824 their forces surrounded a smaller army of around 1,000 British troops under the governor of West Africa, General Sir Charles McCarthy (?–1824) at Accra, defeating them and forcing the suicide of a humiliated McCarthy. The series of correct wars between the Fante people and Ashanti begins in 1826, ending with a pact in 1831, however breaking out once more in 1873.

Bond of 1844 signed

The Bond of 1844, a pact between the Fante chiefs and the British Government, is signed. The Bond legalized the imposition of nation system throughout Fanteland (in modern–day southern Ghana), and conjointly secure the Fante that the British would shield them within the event of an Ashanti attack. The Fante were allied with the British throughout the Ashanti War (1873–1874).

See also
Ashanti Empire
Ga–Fante War

References
 Adu Boahen: Politics in Ghana, 1800–1874. In: History of West Africa, London 1974, .
 Manoukian, Madeline, Akan and Ga-Adangme Peoples. London: International African Institute Edited by Daryll Forde, 1950 
 Rev. W.T Balmer, M.A., B.D. A History of the Akan Peoples of the Gold Coast: "Result of the Invasion of Fanti by Ashanti" 101–103. The Atlantis Press, 1925
 Black Studies Center, Akan Kingdom reigns. Ghana.1695.
 BSC, First Anglo-Ashanti War begins. West Africa.1823.
 Black Studies Center, Bond of 1844 signed. 1844.

Wars involving the Ashanti Empire
Wars involving the states and peoples of Africa
Wars involving the United Kingdom
History of Ghana
Conflicts in 1806
Conflicts in 1807
19th century in Africa